Levytsky or Levytskyi or Levytska is a surname of Ukrainian origin and may refer to

 Dmytro Levytsky (1877–1942), a lawyer and major political figure
 Ivan Nechuy-Levytsky, a Ukrainian writer
 Kost Levytsky, the head of government of the West Ukrainian People's Republic in 1918-1919
 Maksym Levytskyi (born 1972), a retired Ukrainian footballer
 Mykhailo Levytsky, a metropolitan of Lviv
 Mykhailo Vasylyovych Levytsky, diplomat
 Mykhailo Vasylyovych Levytsky, poet
 Orest Levytsky (1848–1922), a Ukrainian historian, ethnographer
 Tetiana Levytska-Shukvani (born 1990), a Ukrainian-born Georgian judoka
 Volodymyr Levytsky (1872–1956), a Ukrainian mathematician

See also
 Levitsky, a Russian version
 Levitzky, a Jewish version
 Lewicki, a Polish version

Ukrainian-language surnames